Sarab-e Darai (also Romanized as Sarāb-e Dārā’ī; also known as Sarsarāb-e Dārā’ī) is a village in Beyranvand-e Jonubi Rural District, Bayravand District, Khorramabad County, Lorestan Province, Iran. In 2006, its population was 36, in 8 families.

References 

Towns and villages in Khorramabad County